The Ayizo languages (Ayizɔ) are Gbe languages spoken in Benin. They are Ayizo, Kotafon, and Gbesi.

Distribution 
The Ayizo languages are spoken in Benin across and near the Mono River, in the Departments of Atlantique, Kouffo, Mono, Oueme, and parts of the Zou Department.

Classification 
The Ayizo languages are classified in the Phla–Phera languages, a group of the Gbe languages.
The Ayizo languages are:
 Ayizo
 Kotafon
 Gbesi
The Saxwe language was previously classified as an Ayizo language.

Additionally, the Ayizo languages can also be known as the Ayizo–Kotafon–Gbesi languages to distinguish it with the Ayizo language proper.

Orthography 
The Ayizo alphabet is based on the Latin alphabet, with the addition of the letters Ɖ/ɖ, Ɛ/ɛ, and Ɔ/ɔ, and the digraphs gb, hw, kp, ny, and xw.

Tone marking 
Tones are marked as follows:

 Acute accent marks the rising tone: xó, dó
 Grave accent marks the falling tone: ɖò, akpàkpà
 Caron marks falling and rising tone: bǔ, bǐ
 Circumflex accent marks the rising and falling tone: côfù
 Macron marks the neutral tone: kān

Tones are fully marked in reference books, but not always marked in other writing. The tone marking is phonemic, and the actual pronunciation may be different according to the syllable's environment.

References 

Gbe languages